Grant Huscroft is a Canadian jurist and legal scholar, who currently serves as a justice of the Court of Appeal for Ontario.

Biography
Huscroft was educated at the University of Western Ontario (BA 1980), Queen's University (LL.B. 1984), and the University of Auckland (LL.M. 1987).

Huscroft taught at the University of Auckland Law School between 1992 and 2001 and then the University of Western Ontario Faculty of Law from 2002 to 2014, where he was Associate Dean from 2006 to 2008.

Huscroft was appointed to the Court of Appeal for Ontario in 2014 on the advice of Prime Minister Stephen Harper.

During his time on the bench, Huscroft was in the habit of giving lectures to law students at their university. For instance, in a January 2016 appearance at Queen's University, he said that:

Huscroft also has participated in Canadian Institute for the Administration of Justice seminars, such as when he presented a paper on "Sufficiency of tribunal reasons: when do a tribunal’s reasons engage issues of procedural fairness" at their May 2016 Advanced Judicial Seminar on Administrative Law reunion.

Notable judgments

In re Greenhouse Gas Pollution Pricing Act
In June 2019, Huscroft wrote in his dissenting GHGPPA opinion that the decision of the majority could have repercussions to the existing that division of powers between the provinces and the federal government. He noted: "federalism is no constitutional nicety; it is a defining feature of the Canadian constitutional order that governs the way in which even the most serious problems must be addressed" and "in effect, [the federal government] has asked the court to sanction a change to the constitutional order -- to increase Parliament's lawmaking authority while diminishing that of the provincial legislatures, and to do so on a permanent basis." Huscroft's dissent was described as "traditionalist" in its view of the division of powers and compared to Gérard La Forest, a former puis-ne on the Supreme Court of Canada, by former Attorney-General Peter MacKay.

Published works

In the popular press
Huscroft outlined his criticism of the Canadian Charter of Rights and Freedoms in a 2012 newspaper article. He argued that the passage of the Charter has provided constitutional status to rights and freedoms while empowering judges to strike down laws passed by democratically elected representatives that are seen to infringe on these rights and freedoms, and that this has resulted in political questions increasingly being brought before the courts and out of the purview of elected representatives.  In his view, judges do not have any greater insights into complex social and moral issues than any other person, and therefore the power to find solutions to these issues must be put back in the hands of democratically elected representatives.  In support of his position, he pointed out that many judicial decisions interpreting and applying the charter have been controversial, and the opinions of Supreme Court judges have often been divided in these cases.

Articles

Learned texts, as editor
  .
 
 
 
 
 
  .

References

University of Western Ontario alumni
Queen's University Faculty of Law alumni
University of Auckland alumni
Academic staff of the University of Auckland
Academic staff of the University of Western Ontario
Justices of the Court of Appeal for Ontario
Canadian legal scholars
Living people
Year of birth missing (living people)